Inajá is a city  in the state of Pernambuco, Brazil. The population in 2020, according with IBGE was 23,645 inhabitants and the total area is 1168.16 km².

Geography

 State - Pernambuco
 Region - Sertão Pernambucano
 Boundaries - Floresta and Ibimirim    (N);  Tacaratu and Alagoas state   (S);  Manari   (E);   Tacaratu   (W).
 Area - 1182.16 km²
 Elevation - 355 m
 Hydrography - Moxotó River
 Vegetation - Caatinga  hiperxerófila
 Climate - semi arid - (Sertão) hot
 Annual average temperature - 25.3 c
 Distance to Recife - 412.4 km

The municipality contains part of the  Serra Negra Biological Reserve, a strictly protected conservation unit created in 1982.

Economy

The main economic activities in Inajá are based in commerce and agribusiness, especially creation of goats, sheep, cattle, pigs, horses, chickens;  and plantations of tomatoes and water melons.

Economic Indicators

Economy by Sector
2006

Health Indicators

References

Municipalities in Pernambuco